Pseudophoenix sargentii, commonly known as the Florida cherry palm or buccaneer palm, is a medium-sized palm native to the northern Caribbean, eastern Mexico, and extreme southeast Atlantic Florida.

Description
Pseudophoenix sargentii is usually near the sea on sandy or limestone soils.  The palm grows in a ringed truck fashion to 8 metres tall and up to 30 centimetres in diameter, often slightly swollen. Yellowish flowers are spaced in loose clusters.

Conservation
This species is thought to perhaps be secure in the wild, although little data exists on the abundance or distribution of its worldwide population. In Florida, this species is considered critically endangered. It was historically found only on Elliott Key, Long Key, and Sands Key. A large population from Long Key was destroyed in the early 20th century after they were dug and sold as ornamentals. Today, the only natural population remaining in Florida is on Elliott Key, consisting of less than 50 individuals. It is considered Vulnerable by the IUCN.

Cultivation
Pseudophoenix sargentii is a handsome palm and cultivated in the specialty horticulture trade and available as an ornamental palm for private gardens, habitat gardens, and various types of municipal, commercial, and agency sustainable landscape and restoration projects.

References

sargentii
Trees of the Caribbean
Trees of Belize
Flora of Florida
Trees of Quintana Roo
Flora of the Yucatán Peninsula
Garden plants of North America
Ornamental trees